Observation Point is a  elevation Navajo Sandstone feature located in Zion National Park, in Washington County of southwest Utah, United States. A popular 8-mile round-trip trail climbs from the Weeping Rock trailhead along Zion Canyon Road to reach the top. Neighbors visible from the point include The Great White Throne, Cathedral Mountain, Angels Landing, and Cable Mountain. This geographical feature's name was officially adopted in 1934 by the U.S. Board on Geographic Names.

Climate
Spring and fall are the most favorable seasons to visit Observation Point. According to the Köppen climate classification system, it is located in a Cold semi-arid climate zone, which is defined by the coldest month having an average mean temperature below , and at least 50% of the total annual precipitation being received during the spring and summer.

Gallery

See also
 Geology of the Zion and Kolob canyons area
 Colorado Plateau

References

External links
 Zion National Park National Park Service
 Weather forecast: National Weather Service

Mountains of Utah
Zion National Park
Mountains of Washington County, Utah
Sandstone formations of the United States